The Insider is an independent online newspaper specializing in investigative journalism, fact-checking and political analytics. The newspaper is known for exposing fake news in Russian media. The editorial office of the website is located in Riga, Latvia. Andris Jansons is the editor-in-chief of the website.

History

Matilda 2017 film 
In February 2017, The Insider reported that the financing of the Russian film Matilda was obtained through the Cypriot offshore company Tradescan Consultant. The receipt of the funds was formalized as a loan, but without an obligation to return. The journalists handed over the materials of their investigation on the financing scheme to the Russian State Duma deputy Natalia Poklonskaya, which she subsequently sent to the Investigative Committee with a request to initiate a criminal case on corruption.

Poisoning of Sergei and Yulia Skripal 
In September 2018, in collaboration with the Bellingcat network and the BBC's Newsnight television program, The Insider conducted an investigation, publishing copies of official documents of the Federal Migration Service of Russia claiming to issue a passport in the name of Alexander Petrov, one of individuals accused of poisoning Sergei and Yulia Skripal in the United Kingdom, indicating his connection with the Russian intelligence agencies. The documents were provided by a source from the Russian police. Roman Dobrokhotov himself admitted that he did not know how the personal data of "Boshirov" and "Petrov" were obtained, stating that he himself "did not violate any laws", and that The Insider received information from Bellingcat. The Insider also discovered that the third participant in the poisoning of Skripal was associated with the poisoning of Bulgarian businessman Emilian Gebrev in 2015.

Assassination of Zelimkhan Khangoshvili 
The Insider, together with Bellingcat and Der Spiegel, conducted an investigation and on August 30, 2019 stated that the murder of the former military commander Zelimkhan Khangoshvili in Berlin on August 23, 2019 was committed by a man working for the Russian intelligence agencies. The investigating group published materials in which they uncovered the real identity of the killer.

Poisoning of Alexei Navalny 
In 2017, Russia announced it had disposed of all available chemical weapons. In October 2020, following the poisoning of Alexei Navalny with chemical weapon Novichok, a joint investigation by The Insider, Bellingcat, Der Spiegel and Radio Liberty concluded that:
They found out what scientists and government structures were involved in the development of the Novichok, their connection between each other and the alleged form in which the chemical weapon was used.

In December 2020, The Insider and Bellingcat in co-operation with CNN, Der Spiegel and Anti-Corruption Foundation published a joint investigation, in which they revealed details of what relationship the Russia's Federal Security Service (FSB) has to the poisoning of Navalny. The authors of the investigation named all the employees involved in the operation, as well as several of their pseudonyms. The investigation team used geolocation data, flight passenger records and telephone data to track and identify these agents.

Malaysia Airlines Flight 17 
In April 2020, The Insider, Bellingcat and BBC during the independent investigation identified one of the main persons involved in the Malaysian Boeing crash. The Insider said that they used voice-comparison technology, travel information and phone records to establish a person's identity. The outlet journalists contacted professor Catalin Grigoras of the National Center for Media Forensics at the University of Colorado Denver and asked him to conduct an analysis of audio recordings, as a result of which the likelihood ratio (LR) was 94.

In November 2020, The Insider and Bellingcat conducted a joint investigation into how the Main Directorate of the General Staff of the Armed Forces of the Russian Federation (GRU) coordinated the activities of the Bonanza Media media project, which spread fakes about the crash of a Malaysian Boeing in eastern Ukraine. The investigation team said that the head of the project was GRU Colonel Sergey Chebanov.

Poisoning of Vladimir Kara-Murza 
In February 2021, a Bellingcat joint investigation with The Insider and Der Spiegel said that Vladimir Kara-Murza was followed by the same FSB unit that allegedly poisoned Alexei Navalny before he fell ill in 2015 and 2017.

2014 Vrbětice ammunition warehouses explosions

Poisoning of Dmitry Bykov

2022 Russian invasion of Ukraine 

The Insider covered events during the Russian invasion of Ukraine in 2022. On 23 March 2022, its correspondent Oksana Baulina was killed by a Russian missile in Kyiv. Before her death, she made several reports from Lviv and Kyiv. Prior to joining The Insider, Baulina worked as a producer for the Anti-Corruption Foundation.

Awards 
On November 10, 2017, The Insider received the World Forum for Democracy Council of Europe Award for Innovation in Democracy with the following wording: "The Insider is an investigative newspaper that seeks to provide its readers with information about the current political, economic and social situation in Russia, while also promoting democratic values and shedding light on issues related to human rights and civil society. In addition, The Insider implements the 'Antifake' project, with the objective of systematically debunking fake news in Russian media, and to help its audience to distinguish relevant information from fake news and propaganda."

In May 2019, The Insider and Bellingcat received the European Press Prize for establishing the identity of the two men responsible for the poisoning of Sergei and Yulia Skripal.

In May 2019, The Insider's economic observer Boris Grozovski received Redkollegia award for his article "Calls to Fight Against Slavery Threatens the State System." How the market of "experts" works in the service of the SK".

In August 2019, The Insider received Free Media Awards for "Supporting Independent Journalism in Eastern Europe". This award is presented by two organisations — Zeit from Hamburg and the Fritt Ord foundation (Norway).

In February 2021, The Insider's article "Counter-sanctions. How FSB officers tried to poison Vladimir Kara-Murza" received Redkollegia award.

Persecution in Russia 
On 23 July 2021 Russia’s Ministry of Justice added The Insider to its  of "foreign mass media performing the functions of a foreign agent". On 14 December 2021 a court in Moscow ordered the outlet to pay 1 million rubles. On 15 July 2022, the publication was banned in Russia alongside Bellingcat. Following this restriction, any Russian citizen who aids Bellingcat or The Insider may face criminal prosecution; they would also be restricted from citing their publications. The office of the Prosecutor-General of Russia said that they were banned due to "posing a threat to the security of the Russian Federation".

References

External links 
 

2013 establishments
Citizen journalism
Freedom of information
Intelligence websites
Investigative journalism
Malaysia Airlines Flight 17
Open-source intelligence
Russian-language websites
Russian news websites
Citizen journalism websites
Free Media Awards winners
Bilingual newspapers
Media listed in Russia as foreign agents
Democracy promotion
English-language websites
Undesirable organizations in Russia